Sarsour is an Arabic surname that translates into English as cockroach. Notable people with the surname include:

Linda Sarsour (born 1980), American activist of Palestinian ancestry
Rubel Sarsour (born 1983), Arab-Israeli football player

References